Rogozen Island is a conspicuous island off the northwest coast of Robert Island, South Shetland Islands situated  north-northeast of Cornwall Island,  south-southwest of Heywood Island, and  northwest of Svetulka Island in the  Onogur group. Surface area .

Bulgarian early mapping in 2009.  Named after the settlement of Rogozen in northwestern Bulgaria in connection with the Rogozen Thracian treasure.

See also 
 Composite Antarctic Gazetteer
 List of Antarctic islands south of 60° S
 SCAR
 Territorial claims in Antarctica

Notes

References
Rogozen Island. SCAR Composite Antarctic Gazetteer
 Bulgarian Antarctic Gazetteer. Antarctic Place-names Commission. (details in Bulgarian, basic data in English)

External links
 Rogozen Island. Copernix satellite image

Islands of Robert Island
Bulgaria and the Antarctic